Anders Ferslev Klynge (born 14 October 2000) is a Danish professional footballer, who plays as a midfielder for Silkeborg IF.

Club career

OB
Klynge started playing football at OKS when he was four years old and later joined OB as a U-15 player.

Klynge got his official and professional debut for OB on 26 June 2020 against Lyngby Boldklub in the Danish Superliga. Klynge started on the bench, but replaced Moses Opondo in the halftime. However, he was substituted again in the 90th minute, as he received a yellow card, two minutes into his debut. Klynge did also play in the following five league matches.

On 13 July 2020 OB's sporting director confirmed, that Klynge would leave the club at the end of the season, as his contract was expiring.

Silkeborg IF
On 3 August 2020, Klynge signed a three-year deal with Danish 1st Division club Silkeborg IF. He got his debut on 3 September 2020 against St. Restrup IF in the Danish Cup. Klynge helped Silkeborg with promotion to the Danish Superliga for the 2020-21 season, playing 30 league games for the club, in which he scored two goals and made six assist.

References

External links
 Anders Klynge at Silkeborg IF
 

2000 births
Living people
Danish men's footballers
Association football midfielders
Danish Superliga players
Odense Kammeraternes Sportsklub players
Odense Boldklub players
Silkeborg IF players